Mokuaikaua Church, located on the "Big Island" of Hawaii, is the oldest Christian church in the Hawaiian Islands. The congregation dates to 1820 and the building was completed in 1837.

History

The congregation was first founded in 1820 by Asa and Lucy Goodale Thurston, from the first ship of American Christian Missionaries, the brig Thaddeus. They were given permission to teach Christianity by King Kamehameha II, and the Queen Regent Kaahumanu. After the royal court relocated to Honolulu, they briefly moved there. In October 1823, they learned that the people of Kailua-Kona had developed an interest in the new ways and had erected a small wooden church.
The first structure on the site was made from Ohia wood and a thatched roof, on land obtained from Royal Governor Kuakini across the street from his Hulihee Palace.
The name moku aikaua literally means "district acquired by war" in the Hawaiian language, probably after the upland forest area where the wood was obtained.

After several fires, the present stone structure was constructed, partially from stones recycled from a nearby Heiau (ancient temple of the Hawaiian religion), from about 1835 to 1837. The interior is decorated with Koa wood.

Today

The church continues to be in use and is open to the public for tours, with some artifacts on display, such as a scale model of the Thaddeus. The other notable members of that first company were Rev. and Mrs. Hiram Bingham I. The state historic place register lists it as site 10-28-7231 as of January 1978. On October 3, 1978, it was added to the National Register of Historic Places listings on the island of Hawaii as site number 78001015.

See also
List of the oldest churches in the United States

References

External links

Official Mokuaikaua Congregational Church web site

Churches on the National Register of Historic Places in Hawaii
Churches in Hawaii
Religious buildings and structures in Hawaii County, Hawaii
Historic American Buildings Survey in Hawaii
1820 establishments in Hawaii
Churches completed in 1837
National Register of Historic Places in Hawaii County, Hawaii
Kailua-Kona, Hawaii